Light Up the Night is the fourth album by the Los Angeles, California-based duo The Brothers Johnson, released in 1980. The album topped the U.S. R&B albums chart and reached number five on the pop albums chart. The single "Stomp!" became a dance hit, reaching number one on both the R&B singles and disco charts and top ten on the pop singles chart.

Light Up the Night was the final Brothers Johnson album to be produced by Quincy Jones. When Jones left A&M Records, he was contractually barred from having contact with the brothers.

This album includes the song "This Had to Be", co-written and co-produced by Michael Jackson

Track listing

Personnel 
The Brothers Johnson
 George Johnson – lead guitar, rhythm guitar, backing vocals, lead vocals (1, 2, 3, 5, 6, 8)
 Louis Johnson – acoustic piano, Prophet-5, guitars, lead guitar (3), bass, bass solo (1), backing vocals

Additional musicians
 Greg Phillinganes – synthesizers (1), acoustic piano, electric piano
 Rod Temperton – electric piano (1)
 Steve Porcaro – synthesizers, synthesizer programming 
 John Robinson – drums
 Paulinho da Costa – percussion, vocal percussion (9)
 Richard Heath – percussion, lead and backing vocals (4)
 Kim Hutchcroft – flute, baritone saxophone, soprano saxophone, tenor saxophone 
 Larry Williams – flute, alto saxophone, tenor saxophone, synthesizers (7, 9)
 Bill Reichenbach Jr. – euphonium, trombone, slide trumpet 
 Gary Grant – trumpet, flugelhorn
 Jerry Hey – trumpet, flugelhorn, French horn
 Merry Clayton – backing vocals 
 Jim Gilstrap – backing vocals 
 Susaye Greene-Brown – backing vocals 
 Josie James – backing vocals 
 Valerie Johnson – backing vocals 
 Quincy Jones – backing vocals
 Scherrie Payne – backing vocals
 Alex Weir – lead and backing vocals (3)
 Michael Jackson – backing vocals fills (5)

Arrangements
 The Brothers Johnson – rhythm arrangements 
 Quincy Jones – rhythm, synthesizer and BGV arrangements 
 Rod Temperton – synthesizer arrangements, BGV arrangements 
 Johnny Mandel – synthesizer arrangements 
 Jerry Hey – horn and string arrangements 
 Bill Reichenbach Jr. – string conductor 
 Michael Jackson – BGV arrangements (5)

Production 
 Quincy Jones – producer 
 Bruce Swedien – recording, mixing 
 Tim Gerrity – assistant engineer 
 Ralph Osborn – assistant engineer
 Randy Pipes – assistant engineer
 John Van Nest – assistant engineer
 Bernie Grundman – mastering 
 Chuck Beeson – art direction 
 Glen Wexler – art direction, cover concept, photography 
 Ed Eckstien – cover concept 
 Kurt Triffet – illustration 
 The Fitzgerald/Hartley Co. – direction

Charts and certifications

Charts

Year-end charts

Singles

Certifications

References

External links
 Brothers Johnson - Light Up the Night at Discogs

1980 albums
The Brothers Johnson albums
A&M Records albums
Albums produced by Quincy Jones
Albums recorded at A&M Studios